Lightning Romance is now not considered a lost film. This 1924 American silent action film was directed by Albert S. Rogell and starring Reed Howes, Ethel Shannon and Wilfred Lucas.

Cast
 Reed Howes as Jack Wade 
 Ethel Shannon as Lila Grandon 
 Wilfred Lucas as Richard Wade 
 David Kirby as Red Tayor 
 Cuyler Supplee as Arnold Stewart 
 Frank Hagney as Arizona Joe 
 H.C. Hallett as Butler

References

Bibliography
 Langman, Larry. A Guide to Silent Westerns. Greenwood Publishing Group, 1992.

External links
 

1924 films
1920s action films
1920s English-language films
American silent feature films
American action films
American black-and-white films
Films directed by Albert S. Rogell
Rayart Pictures films
1924 lost films
Lost action films
Silent action films
1920s American films